Alexander Givvons (2 November 1913 – 14 June 2002) was a Welsh rugby union and professional rugby league footballer who played in the 1930s and 1940s.

Background
Alex Givvons was born in Pillgwenlly, Newport, Wales, he died aged 88 in Oldham, Greater Manchester, England.

Playing career

International honours
Alex Givvons won caps for Wales (RL) while at Oldham 1936–1939 6-caps.

Challenge Cup Final appearances
Alex Givvons played in Huddersfield's 7–4 victory over Bradford Northern in the first-leg of the 1944–45 Challenge Cup Final during the 1944–45 season at Fartown Ground, Huddersfield, and in the 6–5-second-leg victory at Odsal Stadium, Bradford.

County Cup Final appearances
During Alex Givvons' time at Oldham, they had a 12–0 victory over St Helens Recs in the 1933–34 Lancashire County Cup Final during the 1933–34 season at Station Road, Swinton on Saturday 18 November 1933.

Honoured at Oldham RLFC
Alex Givvons is an Oldham Hall of Fame Inductee.

Honoured in Oldham
Givvons Fold in Oldham is named after Alex Givvons.

Genealogical information
Alex Givvons was the son of Alexander Givvons (Snr), and Johannah Dunn (birth registered second ¼ 1896) their marriage was registered during fourth ¼ 1915 in Newport district. Alex Givvons was the eldest brother of; Frank W. Givvons (birth registered fourth ¼ 1916 in Newport district), Mary M. Givvons (birth registered third ¼ 1918 in Newport district), Margaret F. Givvons (birth registered second ¼ 1920 in Newport district), and Trevor P. W. Givvons (birth registered third ¼ 1925 in Newport district). Alex Givvons' marriage to Eunice (née Clayton) (birth registered second ¼ 1914 in Oldham district) was registered during fourth ¼ 1934 in Oldham district. They had children; future rugby union, and rugby league / 1950s and 1960s, for Oldham RUFC, St Patrick's ARLFC, Saddleworth Rangers ARLFC, Oldham St Anne's ARLFC, Halifax, Swinton, and Blackpool Borough, and referee of the 1970s and 1980s; Alexander Givvons, Jr. (birth registered first ¼ 1935 – April 2017 (aged 82)) (Alex Givvons Jr. was the referee for Hull Kingston Rovers' 11–7 victory over Castleford in the 1971 Yorkshire County Cup Final during the 1971–72 season at Belle Vue, Wakefield on Saturday 21 August 1971), and Trevor A. Givvons (birth registered first ¼ ).

References

External links
Oldham Hall of Fame
Statistics at orl-heritagetrust.org.uk
 Deaths Of Two Fine Rugby Men

1913 births
2002 deaths
Black British sportspeople
Cross Keys RFC players
Footballers who switched code
Huddersfield Giants players
Oldham R.L.F.C. players
Rugby league halfbacks
Rugby league locks
Rugby league players from Newport, Wales
Rugby league utility players
Rugby union players from Newport, Wales
Rugby union scrum-halves
Wales national rugby league team players
Welsh rugby league players
Welsh rugby league referees
Welsh rugby union players